Century Cruises (Chinese: 世纪游轮), also known as New Century Cruises, is a river cruise line headquartered in Chongqing, China. It provides multi-day cruises on the Yangtze river.

Destinations
Century Cruises is the most experienced and most luxurious cruise line on the Yangtze River. Century Cruises take pride in the high quality of the itineraries , the unique sightseeing and the personal service to clients. 

Century Cruises offers cruises on the Yangtze river. It offers daily cruises between Chongqing and Yichang. The downstream cruise (Chongqing–Yichang) takes 3 nights while the upstream cruise (Yichang–Chongqing) takes 4 nights.

The cruise line occasionally offers cruises between Shanghai and Wuhan, and between Chongqing and Shanghai. Cruises from Chongqing to Shanghai and vice versa takes 14 nights.

Fleet

Current fleet

Future fleet

Former ships

References

External links
  (Mandarin)
  (English)

Cruise lines
Transport companies established in 1997
Companies based in Chongqing
Travel and holiday companies of China
Shipping companies of China
River cruise companies